Daß ein gutes Deutschland blühe is an East German documentary film directed by Joop Huisken. It was released in 1960.

External links
 

1959 films
East German films
1950s German-language films
1950s German films